The Dr. Charles H. Kennedy House is a historic house at 6 Edenwood Lane in North Little Rock, Arkansas.  It is a single story steel frame structure, organized as three hexagonal pods joined by linear sections.  The pods divide the house's functional spaces: one is for public living spaces and amenities, including the kitchen, living room, and dining area, one has the master bedroom suite, and one has a guest space and playroom.  The exterior is clad in a combination of brick veneer and vertical board siding, and the roof is flat except for the pods, which have pyramidal roofs.  The house was built in 1964 to a design by noted Arkansas architect Warren Segraves.

The house was listed on the National Register of Historic Places in 2017.

See also
National Register of Historic Places listings in Pulaski County, Arkansas

References

Houses on the National Register of Historic Places in Arkansas
Houses completed in 1964
Houses in Pulaski County, Arkansas